Rainey/MACC station is a planned underground light rail station in Austin Texas. It will be located in the Downtown Transit Tunnel on Trinity Street near Cesar Chavez Street, north of the railway's bridge over Lady Bird Lake.

The station takes its name from the adjacent Emma S. Barrientos Mexican American Cultural Center and the nearby Rainey Street Historic District.

References

Future Capital MetroRail stations
Buildings and structures in Austin, Texas
Proposed railway stations in the United States
Railway stations scheduled to open in 2029
Railway stations located underground in the United States